Damir Bajs (born 7 October 1964 in Pakrac, Yugoslavia) is Croatian politician and former Croatian Minister of Tourism.

References 

1964 births
Living people
People from Pakrac
Croatian Peasant Party politicians
Tourism ministers of Croatia